The Cruel Sea are an Australian indie rock band from Sydney, New South Wales formed in late 1987. Originally an instrumental-only band, they became more popular when fronted by vocalist Tex Perkins (Beasts of Bourbon and solo) in addition to Jim Elliott on drums, Ken Gormly on bass guitar, Dan Rumour on guitar and James Cruickshank on guitar and keyboards. Their albums include The Honeymoon Is Over (1993), Three Legged Dog (1995) and Over Easy (1998). Some of their best-known songs are "Better Get a Lawyer", "Takin' All Day", "The Honeymoon Is Over" and "Reckless Eyeballin – an instrumental track from their debut album Down Below that became the theme of Australian TV police drama, Blue Heelers. The band has won eight ARIA Music Awards including five in 1994 for work associated with The Honeymoon Is Over.

History

Formation and early years
Danny Rumour (aka Daniel John Atkins) was a member of punk rock bands Blackrunner, Urban Guerrillas, Friction, Ugly Mirrors and Bedhogs in Sydney from the mid-1970s to 1980. In 1980 he formed Sekret Sekret which played a "sprightly brand of punky power pop with psychedelic overtones". Sekret Sekret would often play at Sydney pub, The Grand Hotel, with Rumour assembling an ad hoc line-up of musicians using instruments housed at the venue. With lead vocalist David Virgin (ex-Ugly Mirrors) and Peter Mullany (ex-Johnny Dole & The Scabs), they released four independent singles by 1984. When they broke up in 1987, the line-up included Rumour, Virgin, James Elliot on drums and Ken Gormly on bass guitar.

After Sekret Sekret disbanded, The Cruel Sea was formed in late 1987 by Elliot on drums and Rumour on guitar. They enlisted Dee Corben on bass guitar and his brother, Gerard "Ged" Corben (also in Lime Spiders), on guitar. The name was from a 1964 surf instrumental, "Cruel Sea", by United States group The Ventures (a cover of The Dakotas' 1963 single, which was in turn inspired by the novel and film of the same name). Early gigs in 1988 were played at the Harold Park Hotel, behind a pool table where space was so tight that the guitarists had to move out of the way when pool players took a shot. The original line-up played about 20 shows and parties, then Dee Corben left, he was replaced by former Sekret Sekret bandmate, Gormly. Barry Turnbull (ex-John Kennedy's Love Gone Wrong, The Widdershins) briefly substituted for Gormly on bass guitar. James Cruickshank (The Widdershins) joined on keyboards and guitars.

Early albums: Down Below and This Is Not the Way Home

In 1989, The Cruel Sea invited vocalist Tex Perkins, their lighting technician and member of Beasts of Bourbon, to join them on-stage. Perkins had written lyrics for some of their instrumentals. The band was signed by Red Eye Records and released a 12" extended play (EP), Down Below, in September. It contained nine tracks and was produced by Phil Punch (The Mexican Spitfires) and The Cruel Sea. It was followed by an eleven-track album of the same name, Down Below in December 1990; both releases featured Perkins on vocals. "Reckless Eyeballin – an instrumental track on the album – later became the theme song of Australian TV police drama, Blue Heelers (1994–2006). Although Perkins was also performing with Beasts of Bourbon, The Cruel Sea built a following on the inner-city pub rock circuit with "atmospheric music [that] evoked the feel of wide open spaces". During 1990, Ged Corben left to focus on his work with Lime Spiders.

A single, "I Feel" was released in September 1991 ahead of their second album, This Is Not the Way Home issued in October. It was produced by Tony Cohen (The Birthday Party, Beasts of Bourbon) and The Cruel Sea. The album provided a range of music "from funky Louisiana swamp blues to sweet soul". Vocals by Perkins were compared with Captain Beefheart, John Lee Hooker and Tony Joe White. "4" followed in March 1992 with "This Is Not the Way Home" released as a single in August. After the album's release, the band toured Europe in support of Nick Cave and the Bad Seeds. In March 1993 they released, "Black Stick" as a single, which peaked at No. 25 on the Australian Recording Industry Association (ARIA) Singles Chart. This Is Not the Way Home received a nomination for 'Best Group' at the ARIA Music Awards of 1993.

Mainstream success: The Honeymoon Is Over and Three Legged Dog

In early 1993, The Cruel Sea had Perkins on-board full-time with his commitment to Beasts of Bourbon on hold. The Cruel Sea's third album, The Honeymoon Is Over was produced by the band, Cohen and Mick Harvey (Robert Forster, Anita Lane) of Nick Cave and the Bad Seeds. Released in May, it peaked at No. 4 on the ARIA Albums Chart, and sold over 140,000 copies. The title song, "The Honeymoon Is Over" reached the Top 50 in August. It was followed by a cover of White's 1969 song, "Woman with Soul", which peaked at No. 64. Perkins also performed as a member in the country-blues trio, Tex, Don and Charlie and released Sad But True (1993).

At the ARIA Music Awards of 1994, The Cruel Sea won 'Single of the Year' and 'Song of the Year' for "The Honeymoon is Over", 'Album of the Year' and 'Best Group' for The Honeymoon is Over and received three further nominations including 'Best Cover Art' by Kristyna Higgins and Jay Manby. At an after-party, a drunken guest attacked Higgins, a professional photographer, and a fracas ensued with Perkins defending his partner. Also that night, two of their ARIA trophies were stolen. Late in 1994, the group toured Europe, again supporting Nick Cave and the Bad Seeds. They followed with a headlining tour across Europe and to Canada.

The next album, Three Legged Dog, was produced by Cohen, the group and Paul McKercher (Clouds). It was released in April 1995 and peaked at No. 1. The Cruel Sea toured Canada, United States and Europe, followed by a support slot for The Rolling Stones on the Australian leg of their Voodoo Lounge Tour. Top 50 singles from Three Legged Dog were "Better Get a Lawyer" (November 1994), "Just a Man" (March 1995) and "Anybody But You" (July). The album won an ARIA in 1995 for 'Best Group' and two nominations, 'Album of the Year', and  'Best Cover Art' for Higgins and Jim Paton.

Later years

The Cruel Sea's next album, Rock'n Roll Duds, was a compilation of b-sides and studio outtakes, released in November 1995. The group had a two-year hiatus in releases, Perkins issued his first solo album, Far Be it from Me (1996) and contributed to Beasts of Bourbon's Gone (1997). The Cruel Sea returned to their instrumental roots and embarked on a series of gigs without Perkins including the Big Day Out tour.

In February 1998, with Perkins returned, the group released a single, "Hard Times" ahead of its album Over Easy in August. The album was produced by  Daniel Denholm (Frente!, Boom Crash Opera), Phil McKellar (Grinspoon, Frenzal Rhomb), the band and McKercher. It peaked at No. 13 and was followed by their Takin All Day national tour through most of 1998. The band's first greatest hits album, The Most appeared in November 1999 and reached the Top 50. After the success of his first album, Perkins released his second solo album Dark Horses (2000).

In August 2001, ABC-TV broadcast the series, Long Way to the Top. Perkins featured on "Episode 6: Gathering of the Tribes 1984–2000" where he discussed his non-mainstream work with both Beasts of Bourbon and The Cruel Sea,  which were "Providing the poor forgotten 5% with something – who like the really fucked up weird shit". In September their next album, Where There's Smoke, produced by Magoo (Regurgitator, Midnight Oil) and the band, appeared and reached the Top 30. It was followed by another compilation, We Don't Work, We Play Music in October 2002 with "Groovy Situation" issued as a single.

Individual members concentrated on side or solo projects. In early 2005, Perkins returned to Tex Don and Charlie and released All is Forgiven in March. Guitarist and main composer, Rumour began touring and recording with his own roots-style instrumental band, the Dan Rumour Band, and Elliot joined on drums by mid-2006. In August, Perkins declared on ABC2's Dig radio program that The Cruel Sea were no more. Dan Rumour Band appeared on the Australian surf music project Delightful Rain released October, and a documentary film of the same name on Australian television in December. Rumour's first solo album was released in October 2007 as by Dan Rumour and The Drift.

In spite of his earlier statement, The Cruel Sea with Perkins toured Melbourne and Sydney in 2008 before their Blues & Roots Festival performances. They also toured Australia in 2010. The full band joined Bernard Fanning as support for his Day On The Green tour of Australia in October to November 2013.

Guitarist and keyboardist James Cruickshank died on 8 October 2015 after a long battle with bowel cancer.

Members
Jim Elliott – drums (1987–2003, 2008, 2010)
Dan Rumour – guitar, clavinet (1987–2003, 2008, 2010)
Gerard Corben – guitar (1987–1990)
Dee Corben – bass guitar (1987–1988)
James Cruickshank – keyboards, guitar, backing vocals (1988–2003, 2008, 2010) [Died 2015]
Ken Gormly – bass guitar (1988–1990, 1990–2003, 2008, 2010)
Tex Perkins – vocals, harmonica, guitar (1989–2003, 2008, 2010)
Barry Turnbull – bass guitar (1990)

Discography

Studio albums

Compilation albums

Extended plays

Singles

Notes

Awards and nominations

ARIA Awards

The ARIA Music Awards are presented annually from 1987 by the Australian Recording Industry Association (ARIA). The Cruel Sea has won eight awards from twenty nominations.

|-
| 1993 || This Is Not the Way Home || Best Group ||  
|-
| rowspan="9"| 1994 || rowspan="2"| "The Honeymoon Is Over" || Song of the Year ||  
|-
| Single of the Year ||  
|-
| "The Honeymoon Is Over" (Andrew Dominik) || Best Video ||  
|-
| "Black Stick" || Song the Year ||  
|-
| rowspan="5" | The Honeymoon Is Over || Album of the Year ||  
|-
| Best Group ||  
|-
| Best Alternative Release ||  
|-
| Best Cover Art ||  
|-
| Producer of the Year ||  
|-
| rowspan="6" | 1995 || rowspan="3" | Three Legged Dog || Best Group ||  
|-
| Album of the Year ||  
|-
| Highest Selling Album ||  
|-
| The Cruel Sea, Kristyna Higgins, Jim Paton – Three Legged Dog || Best Cover Art ||  
|-
| Tony Cohen, Paul McKercher – Three Legged Dog || Engineer of the Year ||  
|-
| Tony Cohen – Three Legged Dog || Producer of the Year ||  
|-
| 1996 || "Too Fast for Me" (Robbie Douglas-Turner) || Best Video ||  
|-
|rowspan="2"|  1998 || "Takin' All Day" (Mark Hartley) || Best Video ||  
|-
| "Hard Times" – Daniel Denholm, Phil McKellar  || Producer of the Year ||  
|-
|| 1999 ||  "You'll Do" (Andrew Dominik) || Best Video ||  
|-

Mo Awards
The Australian Entertainment Mo Awards (commonly known informally as the Mo Awards), were annual Australian entertainment industry awards. They recognise achievements in live entertainment in Australia from 1975 to 2016. The Cruel Sea won one award in that time.
 (wins only)
|-
| 1994
| The Cruel Sea
| Rock Performer of the Year 
| 
|-

References

General
  Note: Archived [on-line] copy has limited functionality.
  Note: [on-line] version established at White Room Electronic Publishing Pty Ltd in 2007 and was expanded from the 2002 edition. As from September 2010, [on-line] version appears to have an Internal Service Error.
Specific

External links
, Dan Rumour and The Drift member Nick Larkins.
Info on Dan Rumour and The Drift, from Bombora record company.
The Cruel Sea Biography at Tex Perkins .net

ARIA Award winners
Australian indie rock groups
Musical groups established in 1987
Musical groups from Sydney